Gus Holwerda is an American film director.  He wrote, directed, and produced the documentary The Unbelievers, which follows scientists Lawrence Krauss and Richard Dawkins.

Early career
Holwerda began his career writing and directing short films, and wrote and acted in the action TV series The Unjust.

The Unbelievers
In 2013, Holwerda released The Unbelievers, a documentary about atheism, which starred Richard Dawkins and Lawrence Krauss. The film had its world premier at Hot Docs in Toronto, Ontario, Canada.

Intersect
Holwerda released his first narrative feature film, a sci-fi, titled Intersect in 2020.

Personal life
Holwerda and his brother Luke, who is a cinematographer, grew up in a fundamentalist Christian family. He is also a musician.

References

1975 births
Living people
People from Jacksonville, Florida
Film directors from Florida